The kausia was an ancient Macedonian flat hat.

Background
It was worn during the Hellenistic period but perhaps even before the time of Alexander the Great and was later used as a protection against the sun by the poorer classes in Rome.

Depictions of the kausia can be found on a variety of coins and statues found from the Mediterranean to the Greco-Bactrian kingdom and the Indo-Greeks in northwestern Indus. The Persians referred to both the Macedonians and the rest of the Greeks as "Yauna" (Ionians), but made a distinction between "Yauna by the sea" and those "with hats that look like shields" (yauna takabara), probably referring to the Macedonian kausia hat.  According to Bonnie Kingsley the kausia may have came to the Mediterranean as a campaign hat worn by Alexander and veterans of his campaigns in the Indus but according to Ernst Fredricksmeyer the kausia was too established a staple of the Macedonian wardrobe for it to have been imported from Asia to Macedonia.

A modern descendant of the hat may be the Pakol: the familiar and remarkably similar men's hat from Pakistan, Afghanistan and Jammu and Kashmir.

Gallery

See also
Clothing in ancient Greece
Pileus (hat)
Petasos
Konos (helmet)
Pakol

References

External links

Greek clothing
Hats
Culture of Macedonia (ancient kingdom)